Regurgitator (also known as Hamburger) is the debut self-titled debut extended play (EP) by Australian rock band Regurgitator. The band was released independently in October 1994 and re-released in February 1995 after signing with East West Records/Warner Music Australia. The EP peaked at number 45 on the ARIA singles chart.

At the ARIA Music Awards of 1995, the EP was nominated for ARIA Award for Best Adult Alternative Album.

Singles
The EP was supported by two promotional/radio singles "Couldn't Do It" and "Like It Like That"; both of which had video clips; however, no official single was commercially released.

Track listing
"Like It Like That" - 4:19
"Couldn't Do It" - 3:14
"Hang Up" - 2:46
"Nothing to Say" - 2:47
"Pretend Friend" - 5:27

Charts

NB: Regurgitator appeared on the Australian Singles Chart. For some sources, (such as Australian-charts), the title was "Couldn't Do It", for other sources (such as David Kent's The Australian Music Charts) the title is Regurgitator.

Release history

References

1994 debut EPs
EPs by Australian artists
Regurgitator albums
Self-released EPs
East West Records EPs